The Jordan 198 was the Formula One car with which the Jordan team competed in the 1998 Formula One World Championship. It was driven by 1996 World Champion Damon Hill, who had moved from Arrows, and Ralf Schumacher, who was in his second season with the team. Test driver Pedro de la Rosa also drove the Jordan 198 during test sessions in 1998.

Overview
The 198 ran promisingly in pre-season testing, however the car struggled in the early part of the season. Damon Hill complained of understeer and the Mugen Honda engine was down on power. After Jordan failed to score a point in the first half of the season, Gary Anderson left the team and Eddie Jordan hired Mike Gascoyne to rework the car. Numerous improvements were made to the 198's suspension, front wing and floor, while Mugen developed the engine. Further tyre development work by Goodyear enabled the team to enjoy a resurgence, scoring points in every race bar one in the second half of the season. This included Hill taking their first F1 victory at the Belgian Grand Prix, with Schumacher second. Schumacher also finished third in Italy, while Hill was fourth on three occasions. The team ultimately finished fourth in the Constructors' Championship with 34 points, four behind Williams in third and one ahead of Benetton in fifth.

Complete Formula One results
(key) (results in bold indicate pole position)

Notes

References

AUTOCOURSE 1998-99, Henry, Alan (ed.), Hazleton Publishing Ltd. (1998) 

Jordan Formula One cars
1998 Formula One season cars